Elections to North-East Fife Council were held in May 1988, the same day as the other Scottish local government elections.

The Westminster constituency seat covering the same area had been won by the Liberal candidate (and future Liberal Democrat leader) Menzies Campbell from the Conservative party in the previous year's general election.

Election results

Ward results

References

1988 Scottish local elections
1988